Mi Niña Lola (My Child Lola) is the second studio album by Spanish singer Concha Buika. The record was released on April 3, 2006 via DRO Atlantic label.

Reception
The album sold 80,000 copies in Spain and sold well in neighboring France too. Mi Niña Lola won many awards (including best produced album at the 2007 Premios de la Música, the Spanish Grammys) and international acclaim. Buika toured widely as a result. The album reached No. 11 on the Spanish albums chart.

Track listing

Personnel
Acoustic Guitar [Flamenco Guitar] – Niño Josele 
Backing Vocals, Handclaps [Palmas] – Barriga Blanca, El General 
Bass – Alain Pérez (tracks: 1 to 5, 7 to 11) 
Drums – Horacio "El Negro" Hernandez 
Executive Producer – Azules Y Moraos 
Lead Vocals, Backing Vocals – Buika 
Mastered By – Alan Silverman 
Mixed By – Pepe Loeches 
Percussion, Backing Vocals, Handclaps [Palmas] – Ramón Porrina 
Piano – José Reinoso (tracks: 1 to 4, 6 to 8, 10, 11) 
Producer – Javier Limón 
Recorded By – Salomé Limon 
Strings – Manuel Martínez (2), Pere Bardagí 
Trumpet – Jerry González 
Vocals [Voz Flamenca Invitada] – Montse Cortés

References 

Original song from Pepe Pinto (real name : José Torres Garzón, Sevilla, 1903-1969)

External links 
Buika's Official Site
Buika Mi Niña Lola

2006 albums
Albums produced by Javier Limón
Concha Buika albums
Spanish-language albums